Tamás Kiss may refer to:

 Tamás Kiss (canoeist) (born 1987), Hungarian sprint canoer and marathon canoeist
 Tamás Kiss (footballer, born 1979), Hungarian footballer for Paksi SE
 Tamás Kiss (footballer, born 1987), Hungarian footballer for Rákospalotai EAC
 Tamás Kiss (footballer, born 2000), Hungarian footballer for Diósgyőr on loan from Puskás Akadémia FC
 Tamás Pál Kiss (born 1991), Hungarian auto racing driver